Manuel Irigoyen Arias y Larrea (March 31, 1829 – June 5, 1912) was a Peruvian lawyer, diplomat, historian, academic and politician. He graduated from the National University of San Marcos and served on its faculty. He was a member of the Chamber of Deputies of Peru and Senate of Peru. He served as minister of foreign affairs and economy and finance (1886-1887) in the Government of Peru, also serving as Ambassador to Belgium from 1861 to 1865, to Ambassador to Brazil from 1874 to 1877 and to Uruguay on two occasions. He was three times Prime Minister of Peru (December 1878 – May 1879, February–August 1890, November 1894 – March 20, 1895). He served as the President of the Senate from 1905 to 1906 and of the National Club (1901-1902).

References

Bibliography
 Basadre Grohmann, Jorge: Historia de la República del Perú. 1822 - 1933, Octava Edición, corregida y aumentada. Tomos 7, 8 y 9. Editada por el Diario "La República" de Lima y la Universidad "Ricardo Palma". Impreso en Santiago de Chile, 1998.
 Tauro del Pino, Alberto: Enciclopedia Ilustrada del Perú. Tercera Edición. Tomo 8. HAB/IZQ. Lima, PEISA, 2001. 
 Publicación del diario El Comercio de Lima, de fecha Jueves 6 de junio de 1912.

1829 births
1912 deaths
19th-century Peruvian lawyers
Presidents of the Senate of Peru
Foreign ministers of Peru
Peruvian Ministers of Economy and Finance
Peruvian diplomats
20th-century Peruvian historians
Members of the Senate of Peru
Members of the Chamber of Deputies of Peru
National University of San Marcos alumni
Academic staff of the National University of San Marcos
19th-century Peruvian historians